Yersinia kristensenii is a species of bacteria. It is Gram-negative and its type strain is 105 (=CIP 80–30). It is potentially infectious to mice. It secretes a bacteriocin that targets related species.

References

External links
LSPN lpsn.dsmz.de
Type strain of Yersinia kristensenii at BacDive -  the Bacterial Diversity Metadatabase

kristensenii
Bacteria described in 1980